Diego Fernando Dorregaray (born 9 May 1992) is an Argentine professional footballer who plays as a forward.

Career
Puerto Nuevo were Dorregaray's first youth club, which was followed by stints with Defensores de La Esperanza, Villa Dálmine and Boca Juniors before rejoining Puerto Nuevo. His senior career began with the latter in 2007 aged fifteen, appearing locally before playing in the 2009–10 Primera D Metropolitana. They were relegated in 2010–11, before being promoted back for 2014; taking his league record for Puerto Nuevo to twenty-five games and four goals. 2015 saw Dorregaray join fellow Primera D Metropolitana team Sportivo Barracas. Twelve goals in twenty-seven followed, as they won promotion to tier four.

In July 2016, Dorregaray signed for Atlanta. He subsequently scored in ten separate matches in Primera B Metropolitana. On 8 July 2017, Dorregaray joined Ecuadorian Serie A side Guayaquil City. He made his debut on 14 July against Deportivo Cuenca, which preceded his first goal arriving during a 1–1 draw with Emelec at the Estadio Christian Benítez Betancourt. Further goals came against El Nacional, Clan Juvenil, Universidad Católica and L.D.U. Quito as Guayaquil City finished ninth in the second stage. He departed midway through the following campaign, having netted three more times for them in 2018.

Dorregaray returned to Argentina with Defensores de Belgrano in July 2018. In the following January, Dorregaray joined Técnico Universitario back in Ecuador. He scored seven goals, which included one on debut versus Universidad Católica, across two seasons. On 4 July 2020, Dorregaray signed with fellow Ecuadorian club Deportivo Cuenca on a free transfer.

Personal life
Dorregaray's brother, Marcelo, is also a footballer; notably featuring for Puerto Nuevo in Primera D Metropolitana.

Career statistics
.

Honours
Sportivo Barracas
Primera D Metropolitana: 2015

References

External links

1992 births
Living people
Argentine footballers
Argentine expatriate footballers
Footballers from Buenos Aires
Association football forwards
Primera D Metropolitana players
Primera C Metropolitana players
Primera B Metropolitana players
Ecuadorian Serie A players
Primera Nacional players
Egyptian Premier League players
Club Atlético Puerto Nuevo players
Sportivo Barracas players
Club Atlético Atlanta footballers
Guayaquil City F.C. footballers
Defensores de Belgrano footballers
C.D. Técnico Universitario footballers
C.D. Cuenca footballers
Ismaily SC players
Expatriate footballers in Ecuador
Expatriate footballers in Egypt
Argentine expatriate sportspeople in Ecuador
Argentine expatriate sportspeople in Egypt